The Kitchen is a Jewish community in San Francisco, California. It was founded by Rabbi Noa Kushner in 2011 following her work at Congregation Rodef Sholom.  It describes itself as "one part shabbat + justice + torah community, one part San Francisco experiment and one part tool kit for jewish life at home." It focuses on incubating new ways of helping Jews connect with Jewish religion, text, and practices.  As of 2015, it had approximately 200 member households.

The Kitchen is  a member of the Jewish Emergent Network.

References

Synagogues in San Francisco
2011 establishments in California